Pablo Carreño Busta was the defending champion, but lost in the second round to Julien Benneteau.

Roberto Bautista Agut won the title, defeating Damir Džumhur in the final, 6–4, 6–4.

Seeds
All seeds receive a bye into the second round.

Draw

Finals

Top half

Section 1

Section 2

Bottom half

Section 3

Section 4

Qualifying

Seeds

Qualifiers

Lucky losers

Qualifying draw

First qualifier

Second qualifier

Third qualifier

Fourth qualifier

References
Main Draw
Qualifying Draw

2017 ATP World Tour
2017 Singles